Car Nos. 29–33 are a group of tramcars for the Manx Electric Railway on the Isle of Man.

The seventh and final batch of motorcars to arrive are all extant today, but only two remain in service; by far the most powerful of the line's stock, these cars all remain on the line today, with 32 and 33 still in regular service; they were designed to haul two trailers when built but this was never a day-to-day feature of operation, although they have on occasion hauled two trailers in conjunction with enthusiasts events.  Sister car 29 is in store at Homefield depot having been out of service for many years whilst 30 and 31 are in store on the railway itself but have not turned a wheel in service for many years.

References

Sources
 Manx Manx Electric Railway Fleetlist (2002) Manx Electric Railway Society
 Island Island Images: Manx Electric Railway Pages (2003) Jon Wornham
 Official Official Tourist Department Page (2009) Isle Of Man Heritage Railways

Manx Electric Railway